The 1912 Georgia Tech Yellow Jackets football team represented Georgia Tech as a member of the Southern Intercollegiate Athletic Association (SIAA) during the 1912 college football season. Led by ninth-year head coach John Heisman, the Yellow Jackets compiled an overall record of 5–3–1 with a mark of 5–3 in SIAA play. Georgia Tech played home games at The Flats, the future site of Bobby Dodd Stadium, in Atlanta. Alf McDonald was named to the College Football All-Southern Team as a quarterback.

Schedule

References

External links

Georgia Tech
Georgia Tech Yellow Jackets football seasons
Georgia Tech Yellow Jackets football